Inger Karin Giskeødegård (born 28 June 1956) is a Norwegian illustrator.

She was born in Langevåg, and is an autodidact illustrator. She has worked for Sunnmørsposten since 1985, and has also illustrated in Bergens Tidende, Adresseavisen, Sogn Dagblad, Nytt i Uka, Vestlandsposten and Aftenposten. She won the Editorial Cartoon of the Year award in 2001. She has also illustrated books.

References

1956 births
Living people
Norwegian cartoonists
Norwegian women cartoonists
Norwegian women illustrators
Norwegian editorial cartoonists
People from Møre og Romsdal
People from Langevåg